The New Zealand budget for fiscal year 2007-2008 was presented to the New Zealand House of Representatives by Finance Minister Dr Michael Cullen on 17 May 2007.  

This was the eighth budget Michael Cullen presented as Minister of Finance.

Outline

Tax changes 
Budget 2007 made a number of changes to the tax system:
 reduced the Company Tax rate from 33% to 30%.
 introduced a 15% research and development tax credit.

KiwiSaver 
Budget 2007 made a number of changes to the KiwiSaver scheme:
 Member contributions to KiwiSaver were matched by a tax credit, to a maximum of $20 per week (a total of $1,040 per year);
 Increases to employers contributions to employees KiwiSaver accounts.

Infrastructure 
Budget 2007 announced funding for the Auckland railway electrification project.

References

External links 
 The Beehive - Budget 2007

Budget, 2007
New Zealand budgets
New Zealand budget
May 2007 events in New Zealand